The 1953 UK & Ireland Greyhound Racing Year was the 28th year of greyhound racing in the United Kingdom and Ireland.

Roll of honour

Summary
The annual totalisator was £61,522,849 which constituted a solid year. The main stars of the year were Spanish Battleship, in Ireland and Magourna Reject, in the United Kingdom.

Competitions
There was a surprise in store during the first major event of the year when 1951 Scurry Gold Cup runner up Mushera Silver won the Gold Collar, at 13-2 beating Monachdy Girlie by two lengths. The Scottish Greyhound Derby was cancelled for the second successive year due to insufficient entries  but the Welsh Greyhound Derby received a high standard of entry. Glittering Look made amends for his unlucky Derby performance beating fellow Derby finalists Small Town, Galtee Cleo in addition to Endless Gossip and Ollys Pal.

A competition called the London Tracks Coursing Cup (confined to London track greyhounds) was held near Cambridge and was won by Must Venture trained by Bill Cowell at Wandsworth Stadium. It was an unusual competition because it was becoming increasingly rare for track greyhounds to take part in coursing.

Paddys Dinner who had finished lame in the 1952 English Greyhound Derby reached the Scurry final in July but lost out to Rolling Mike while Daws Dancer made a final appearance for Paddy McEvoy in the Laurels final, before being sold to Wimbledon Stadium Ltd and leased to W J Cearns.

At Wembley, 30,000 people turned up to watch the final of the St Leger, a race that was also seen by several million on television. Defending champion Funny Worker now with Jack Harvey was not expected to beat Magourna Reject but the latter had failed in the classics during 1952. Magourna Reject, now trained by Tom Reilly, had won the Key at Wimbledon, the Stewards Cup at Gloucester and the Wood Lane Stakes at White City before lining up for the St Leger final. His supporters were rewarded as he easily won by five lengths, Funny Worker finished last. Magourna Reject then defeated his rivals in the Cesarewitch final winning by three and a half lengths from Oaks champion Lizette, his time of 33.24sec being the fastest ever for the distance at West Ham Stadium.  Magourna Reject had finished 1953 as double classic champion and was voted Greyhound of the Year by a press panel on behalf of the British Greyhound Breeders and Owners Association.

News
After a misunderstanding, a greyhound called Captain Jock trained by Frank Conlon ran unplaced in an open race at Stamford Bridge in the afternoon and then ran again in the evening at Clapton Stadium without success. It was a regular practice for greyhounds to race early in a racecard to qualify for a final later but very unusual to have to travel to two tracks in the same day. Noreen Collin relinquished her post at the Walthamstow Stadium kennels and was replaced by Tom 'Paddy' Reilly; the kennels included the great Magourna Reject.

Scotland Yard detective Stan Baker published a book called Greyhound Racing with the lid off. It listed 29 stimulants and depressants that are suspected of being used by doping gangs in greyhound racing. The National Greyhound Racing Club (NGRC) are tasked with finding the doping gangs that target tracks running under the NGRC banner and on the independent circuit, two men were jailed for 30 days in Dunfermline for attempting to run a ringer at Crossgates Greyhound Stadium.

Endless Gossip retired after finishing his career with a Select Stakes win at Wembley beating Magourna Reject and Galtee Cleo and a Wimbledon Champion Stakes win in October, which he again won from Magourna Reject with Galtee Cleo third, and brought his winnings to more than £5,000. He won a prize in the show ring at Cruft's and was sold to an American breeder to stand at stud in the United States.

Ireland
Tim O'Connor had taken charge of the litter in Ireland, sired by Spanish Chestnut, the half-brother of Irish Greyhound Derby champion Spanish Lad. One of the litter Spanish Battleship was entered for the St Leger at Limerick but after winning a heat he failed to progress from the second round. O'Connor believed that he had gone well enough and phoned Tom Lynch in Dublin and asked him to train the dog for the 1953 Irish Greyhound Derby. He duly won the Derby and then took part in three competitions; the Laurels, the McCalmont Cup and McAlinden Cup and won every single qualifier, nine races in all but on all three occasions did not win the final. The Laurels had been won by Templenoe Rebel, who then made his way to be trained in England
 as did McAlinden winner Rose of Meath, sold to Arsenal and Scotland footballer Alex Forbes.

Principal UK races

+ Track Record

	

+ Track Record

Totalisator returns

The totalisator returns declared to the licensing authorities for the year 1953 are listed below. Tracks that did not have a totalisator in operation are not listed.

References 

Greyhound racing in the United Kingdom
Greyhound racing in the Republic of Ireland
UK and Ireland Greyhound Racing Year
UK and Ireland Greyhound Racing Year
UK and Ireland Greyhound Racing Year
UK and Ireland Greyhound Racing Year